Rhinella spinulosa is a species of toad in the family Bufonidae that is found in the Andean Argentina, Bolivia, Chile, and Peru.

Rhinella spinulosa has a wide altitudinal range, from the sea level to  asl, and it occurs in a range of habitats: scrubland and grassland in the Andes, and forested areas in the more southern parts of its range; it has also been recorded from arable areas. It breeds in temporary ponds, altiplano lagoons, and slow flowing streams. Where it occurs it tends to be abundant.

References

spinulosa
Amphibians described in 1834
Amphibians of the Andes
Amphibians of Argentina
Amphibians of Bolivia
Amphibians of Chile
Amphibians of Peru
Taxa named by Arend Friedrich August Wiegmann
Taxonomy articles created by Polbot
Southern Andean Yungas